The Mara family is an Irish-American family primarily known for owning the New York Giants of the National Football League (NFL) since the formation of the franchise in 1925. The Maras owned the team outright until 1991, when a feud led to one side of the family selling their 50% interest to Preston Robert Tisch.

Tim Mara
Family patriarch Tim Mara was born in 1887 in New York City to John and Elizabeth (née Harris) Mara. While working as a newsboy, Mara also earned money as a courier for bookmakers. He eventually started his own bookmaking operation and in 1921 became the legal in-track bookmaker at Belmont Park.

Mara was married to Elizabeth "Lisett" Barclay for over 50 years. They had two sons - Jack Mara and Wellington Mara.

In 1925, Mara was awarded New York City's National Football League franchise. In 1930 he transferred ownership to his two sons to protect the team from creditors, but maintained control of the franchise until his death on February 16, 1959. Following his death, the ownership of the Giants was split 50%-50% between Jack and Wellington Mara.

Jack Mara
Mara was born in 1908. He graduated from Fordham University in 1933 with a law degree. However, he never became a practicing lawyer, instead joining the Giants as team president. As president, Mara focused on the team's business operations.

In 1934 he married Helen Phelan, daughter of New York State Athletic Commission chairman John J. Phelan. They had two children - Maura and Timothy J. Mara. 

Jack Mara died on June 29, 1965. Following his death, his 50% share of the team was divided between his wife and two children.
Helen Mara later married Joseph C. Nugent. She died on February 21, 1997, at the age of 89.

Maura Mara was described as "probably the most rabid in the family" by her cousin John Mara. She was married to Richard J. Concannon, a senior partner at Kelley Drye & Warren, for 49 years until his death in 2013. They had three daughters.

Wellington Mara
Mara was born in 1916. He started as the team's waterboy and after graduating from Fordham University worked as a football operations executive. Following his brother's death he assumed the role of president. Mara was heavily involved in league affairs. He was instrumental in creating revenue sharing that saw all teams split profits from television contracts and helped engineer the merger of the NFL and American Football League. He remained team president until his death on October 25, 2005. Wellington was also named after the Duke of Wellington, and his nickname "The Duke" was branded on Wilson's NFL game balls, because of his father's role in making Wilson the NFL's game ball supplier, a partnership that started in 1941 and has continued uninterrupted since; however, from 1970 to 2005, "The Duke" was not used on the balls, until it was restored after Wellington's death for the 2006 season.

Feud and sale of 50% of the team to the Tisch family
Timothy J. Mara represented the interests of his mother and sister following his father's death. He joined the club in 1964 as vice president and treasurer. His first major role with the Giants was overseeing the construction of Giants Stadium. In 1973, amidst a string of losing seasons, Mara suggested that the club hire Andy Robustelli to oversee football operations. 

In 1976, Tim and Wellington Mara had their first major disagreement over the signing of Larry Csonka - Wellington wanted to sign him and Tim did not. The two later clashed over the hiring of assistant director of operations Terry Bledsoe, as Tim believed that Bledsoe would be a puppet for his uncle.

By the end of the 1978 season, the Giants had won only 74 of their last 212 games. On December 18, 1978, Robustelli resigned as director of operations and Tim and Wellington Mara could not agree on a successor. Wellington wanted to promote Bledsoe while Tim wanted to hire Dallas Cowboys personnel director Gil Brandt or Los Angeles Rams general manager Don Klosterman. After a 45 day stalemate, Commissioner Pete Rozelle intervened and a compromise candidate, Jan Van Duser, was chosen. However, Van Duser did not want the job. 13 days later, a second compromise candidate was agreed on and George Young was named general manager of the Giants. Under Young's management, the Giants won Super Bowls Super Bowl XXI and Super Bowl XXV.

Following the public dispute, Wellington and Tim Mara stopped talking to each other and the owner's box at Giants Stadium was divided by a partition. Neither side of the family had enough money to buy out the other one. In 1991, Tim Mara, Helen Mara Nugent, and Maura Mara Concannon sold their shares in the club to Preston Robert Tisch for $70 million.

Children of Wellington Mara
Wellington Mara and his wife Ann Mara had 11 children. They are:
John Mara, president and CEO of the Giants.
Susan (Mara) McDonnell
Chris Mara, Giants' senior vice president of player personnel. Married Kathleen Rooney, a member of the family that owns the Pittsburgh Steelers. They are the parents of actresses Kate Mara and Rooney Mara.
Stephen Mara, works in the financial-services business.
Frank Mara, Giants' vice president of community relations.
Sheila Mara
Kathy (Mara) Morehouse
Maureen (Mara) Brown, wife of former National Hockey League player Doug Brown and mother of NHL player Patrick Brown
Ann Mara Cacase
Meghan (Mara) Brennan
Colleen (Mara) McLane

References

 
New York Giants owners